Minto Park is a park in downtown Ottawa, Ontario, Canada. It occupies a full city block, meeting Elgin Street on the park's west side, Gilmour Street on the north, Cartier Street on the east, and Lewis Street on the south. It contains picnic benches, street lights and several monuments, including Enclave: The Ottawa Women's Monument (a memorial to women who were murdered and abused by men) and a bust of Argentinian general José de San Martín.

See also
List of Ottawa, Ontario parks

Parks in Ottawa